Star Destroyers are capital ships in the fictional Star Wars universe. Star Destroyers were produced by Kuat Drive Yards, later Kuat-Entralla Engineering, and serve as "the signature vessel of the fleet" for the Galactic Republic, Galactic Empire, the First Order, and the Sith Eternal in numerous published works including film, television, novels, comics, and video games.

A single Star Destroyer could project considerable influence over a star system in the name of the Empire: each can be deployed individually as both a forward operating base and as mobile weapon systems platform responsible for safeguarding multiple planets, trade routes, and systems, and carried enough firepower to subdue an entire planetary system or annihilate a small rebel fleet.

Notable examples of Star Destroyers include the precursor Venator-class Star Destroyer (prequel trilogy), the ubiquitous Imperial-class Star Destroyer (original trilogy), and the recent Resurgent-class and Xyston-class Star Destroyer (sequel trilogy). Numerous other classes of "Star Destroyers" share the basic triangular "dagger" hull; the successful v-shaped designs are explained in Legends as reflecting the Empire's "Tarkin's Doctrine" military philosophy and originating from Sith ideological influence, and have been adapted by numerous factions for a wide variety of applications. 

Numerous Star Destroyer models and toys have been released. The iconic scene in Star Wars (1977) featuring the Imperial Star Destroyer's first appearance where it pursues a Corellian Corvette has been called a milestone in special effects history.

Imperial Star Destroyer

Concept and design 

In draft scripts for the film that would become Star Wars, the term "Stardestroyer" refers to two-man fighters flown by what would become the Galactic Empire. The film's second draft features four Star Destroyers chasing a single Rebel ship, but the tremendous costs incurred by Industrial Light & Magic (ILM) when production began helped lead Lucas to use a single "terrifyingly large" Star Destroyer instead of four. ILM built a  shooting model that was about half the size of the model for the Tantive IV the Star Destroyer was chasing. Lucas asked ILM to build a larger Star Destroyer model to match the Tantive IV's scale, but ILM convinced him that the Dykstraflex camera invented for the film made this unnecessary. Nevertheless, they added additional hull details to the Star Destroyer model. The 13-second opening shot was the first special effects piece ILM completed, and its success was an essential test for the Dykstraflex.

ILM built a  Star Destroyer, equipped with internal lighting to provide a better sense of scale, for The Empire Strikes Back (1980).  According to chief model maker Lorne Peterson, the new Star Destroyer model was scaled to appear two and a half miles long, though their official length was revised in later sources.

The Imperial I-class Star Destroyers are white, as shown in A New Hope, Rogue One, and Solo. The Imperial II-class Star Destroyers in The Empire Strikes Back and Return of the Jedi are grey.

Depiction 
The iconic Imperial-class Star Destroyer first appears in the opening scene of Star Wars (1977), where the Imperial Star Destroyer Devastator (carrying Darth Vader) chases the CR90 Corvette Tantive IV (carrying Princess Leia) above Tatooine after the latter had fled from Scarif.  Background literature describes Imperial-class Star Destroyers as the chief warship of the Imperial Navy and symbol of Imperial might.  These enormous capital ships are used to enforce the Emperor's will, bolster Imperial-backed governments, and act as mobile headquarters for senior Imperial commanders.  In addition to their powerful armament, a Star Destroyer carries troops and vehicles for ground operations and a full wing of TIE Fighters (typically 48 fighters, 12 bombers and 12 boarding craft).  A single Star Destroyer is considered sufficient to overwhelm a rebellious planet, though major industrialized worlds may be assaulted by a fleet of six Star Destroyers with support cruisers and supply craft.  Deep-crust survival bunkers are regarded as a last refuge in the event of planetary bombardment by Imperial Star Destroyers.

Darth Vader's Devastator is the last of the Imperial I-class ships to be built by Kuat Drive Yards before switching to the Imperial II-class, a fleet of which take part in the Battle of Hoth as depicted in The Empire Strikes Back (1980).  Designated Death Squadron, this fleet of Star Destroyers is led by Darth Vader aboard the Executor, first in a new class of Super Star Destroyer.  Although the battle is won by Imperial forces, Vader orders his Star Destroyers to focus on capturing the Millennium Falcon rather than hunt down the escaping Rebel transports, allowing many to escape.  The Falcon manages to evade this pursuit by hiding in the sensor blind spot of the Star Destroyer Avenger.  These ships play a major role in the Battle of Endor as depicted in Return of the Jedi (1983).  During the battle, Imperial Star Destroyers prove vulnerable to fleets of starfighters flown by skilled Rebel pilots, who exploit the ships' exposed bridges and deflector shield generators to cause damage.  A year after their defeat at Endor, the Empire makes a last stand at Jakku.  During the battle, Imperial Star Destroyers use their tractor beams to drag New Republic ships down to the planet's surface, where their wrecks form the Graveyard of Ships as seen in The Force Awakens (2015).

Analysis 
According to "Star Wars (2015) #24" by Jason Aaron, a star destroyer weighs about forty million tons. Examining what it would take to build an Imperial Star Destroyer realistically, it was estimated in 2016 that such a vessel would cost $636 billion USD. Using then-current technology and naval vessels as a reference, the ship would generate 146.5 gigawatts of power, and its engines would produce a combined total thrust of 3.5 million newtons.  However getting the parts into space to construct the Star Destroyer would require an additional $44.4 trillion USD in launch costs, suggesting that asteroid mining and refining technologies would have to be developed first to make it more economical.

Joe Pappalardo of Popular Mechanics argues that the Imperial Star Destroyer is a poorly-designed spaceship, being asymmetrical with its superstructure jutting out in one direction.  Additionally, while its wedge shape would make sense for atmospheric travel, it serves no purpose in space.  He argues a more realistic and effective design would be symmetrical and bowl-shaped like a saucer.

Cultural impact 
Lego has released numerous Star Destroyer kits, including a  4,784-piece Imperial-class Star Destroyer.

Super Star Destroyer

Concept and design 
For The Empire Strikes Back, George Lucas wanted Darth Vader's new flagship, Executor, to be huge and to play a greater role in the film.  According to chief model maker Lorne Peterson, the Executors model was six feet long and constructed with over 150,000 individual lights.  The resulting model was so heavy it required additional support to keep from overwhelming the Dykstraflex's mechanical structure. The ship was originally scaled to appear sixteen miles long according to Lorne, though later sources would amend this figure.

 Depiction 
Within the Star Wars universe, the term "Super Star Destroyer" is a colloquialism used to refer to any ship larger than an Imperial Star Destroyer. The largest and most powerful of these is the Executor, which first appeared in The Empire Strikes Back (1980) as the personal flagship of Darth Vader. Its armament includes over 5,000 turbolasers, ion cannons and tractor beam projectors and it can carry more than 1,000 vessels. The crew of the Executor numbers in the hundreds of thousands. Its command tower, rising above the ship's technoscape on a thick stalk, is a standard model found on other Star Destroyers – including a pair of geodesic domes containing communication transceivers, sensors and deflector shield projectors – and allows for an unobstructed view of the battlefield. At least twelve of these vessels were built by the Empire, including the Executor, Annihilator, Ravager and Arbitrator, but the exact number is unknown thanks to Imperial propaganda and black budgets.

From the bridge of the Executor, Darth Vader leads Death Squadron during the Battle of Hoth and afterwards in pursuit of the Millennium Falcon.  It later serves as the Imperial command ship during the Battle of Endor.  At Endor, intense bombardment by the Rebel Alliance fleet cause the ship's shields to fail, allowing Rebel starfighters to strafe the command tower.  During this attack an A-wing piloted by Arvel Crynyd crashes into the command bridge, destroying the main navigation complex and causing the vessel to lose control.  The Executor is lost when the second Death Star's gravity well pulls the ship into its surface, destroying the vessel and damaging the Death Star itself.  At Jakku where the Empire made its last stand, the Super Star Destroyer Ravager is one of the wrecks which make up the Graveyard of Ships.

 Analysis 
Rhett Allain, an associate professor of physics at Southeastern Louisiana University, examined the death of the Executor in a Star Wars Day-themed article for Wired. Additionally, the Executor had a near constant angular velocity of 0.159 radians/second during the scene where it rotates to face the Death Star. For the crew at the front of the ship, this would result in a centripetal acceleration of 39 G.

If a model of the Executor was built to scale and placed hovering over New York City, it would cast a shadow over the island of Manhattan.

 Cultural impact 
Like the Imperial Star Destroyer, the Super Star Destroyer has also been merchandised. Lego released a  3,152-piece model of the Executor.  Kenner wanted to use a less ominous name than Executor for the toy playset of Darth Vader's meditation chamber. An advertisement agency's list of 153 alternatives included Starbase Malevolent, Black Coven, Haphaestus VII, and Cosmocurse; ultimately, the toy was labeled "Darth Vader's Star Destroyer". In 2006, Wizards of the Coast created an Executor miniature as part of its Star Wars Miniatures Starship Battles game. An electronic Super Star Destroyer toy released by Hasbro "is the rarest among Hasbro's Collector Fleet".

 Venator Star Destroyer 

 Concept and design 
The design of the Venator-class Star Destroyers appearing in Revenge of the Sith (2005) are meant to bridge the appearance of the Acclamator-class transports in Attack of the Clones (2002) and the Imperial-class in the original trilogy.  This included making use of the Imperial Star Destroyer bridge set for interior shots of the Venator as a connecting theme.  Additionally, the changing coloration of the Star Destroyers is meant to represent the downfall of the Republic and rise of the Empire.  At the start of the film they are given a red paint scheme first established in The Phantom Menace (1999) as representing the Republic, but by the end they are colorless.

 Depiction 
The Venator-class Star Destroyer makes its first theatrical appearance in Revenge of the Sith during the opening Battle of Coruscant.  Within the Star Wars setting, these ships are regarded as the most powerful capital ships of the Republic Navy during the Clone Wars, serving double duty as battleships and starfighter carriers.  These massive ship require a relatively small crew to operate as a deliberate feature compensating for the fact that the Separatists can produce battle droids faster than the Republic can grow clone troopers.  As a true warship, the Venator-class can feed nearly its entire reactor output (which at maximum power consumes 40,000 tons of fuel per second) into its heavy turbolasers to devastating effect.  As a carrier, the Star Destroyer can rapidly deploy hundreds of starfighters, including ARC-170s, V-wings, Z-95 Headhunters and Jedi interceptors, from a -long dorsal flight deck.  While strong deflector shielding is employed around the armored bow doors, they are slow to open or close, presenting a weakness in the vessel's design.

During the Clone Wars these Star Destroyers, referred to also as Republic attack cruisers or Jedi cruisers, play an important role combating Separatist fleets and providing supporting fire for ground forces.  Thanks to their superior firepower, the Venator-class has a strong advantage against Separatist warships, and a small flotilla of attack cruisers can easily blast through the deflector shields of a Trade Federation Battleship.  At the Battle of Coruscant, over a thousand attack cruisers are deployed to defend the planet, one of which (the Star Destroyer Guarlara) delivers a devastating barrage to the Invisible Hand at point-blank range. After the end of the Clone Wars and creation of the Galactic Empire, these Star Destroyers will continue to serve for decades in the Imperial Navy until eventually replaced with the Imperial-class Star Destroyer.

 Cultural impact 
In 2009, in conjunction with the then ongoing TV show Star Wars: The Clone Wars, Lego released a 1,170 piece model of the Venator. For the 2016 Consumer Electronics Show, noted modder Sander van der Velden created a custom-built PC made to look like a Venator Star Destroyer.  Built around a fully-functional, liquid-cooled PC, the surrounding case was constructed in the shape of a Venator using aluminum and 3D printed material.  The final product required 400 hours of work to complete.

 Resurgent Star Destroyer 
In Star Wars: The Force Awakens (2015), set 30 years after the fall of the Empire, a new class of Star Destroyer is introduced in service to the First Order. The Finalizer, the first of the Resurgent-class Star Destroyers built in secret by Kuat-Entralla Engineering, serves as the flagship for both Kylo Ren and General Hux.Dougherty, et al. While evoking the traditional Imperial-class Star Destroyer, the Resurgent-class incorporates a number of fixes to the former's design flaws, including a less exposed command bridge and larger fighter complement. The ship is armed with thousands of turbolasers and ion cannons, sufficient firepower to slug it out with capital ships or reduce planetary surfaces to molten slag. Additional point-defense laser turrets and missile launchers are used to attack more nimble opponents. Two wings of TIE fighters can be quickly launched from dorsal flight decks and side hangars, and for planetary assaults, the ship carries a full legion of over 8,000 stormtroopers and over a hundred assault vehicles.

 Mega Star Destroyer 
The Mega-class Star Dreadnought Supremacy made its first appearance in The Last Jedi (2017). It has a crew of 2,225,000 personnel, a majority of whom are adolescents training to become officers and stormtroopers. The Supremacy serves as the capital from which Supreme Leader Snoke commands the First Order. Thousands of heavy turbolasers, antiship missile batteries, heavy ion cannons and tractor beam projectors give the ship firepower equivalent to an entire fleet. The vessel also possesses an industrial capacity that would rival most planets, with asteroid mining complexes, foundries, production lines, research labs and training centers. Six external and two internal stations allow Resurgent-class Star Destroyers to dock with the Mega-Destroyer. 

 Sith Star Destroyer 
In Star Wars: The Rise of Skywalker (2019), a reborn Darth Sidious unveils a new class of Star Destroyer as part of the Sith Eternal's fleet, the Final Order. Built on Exegol by automated factories and with a total crew of 29,585 personnel, the distinguishing feature of these Sith Star Destroyers is an axial superlaser powerful enough to shatter a planet, made possible by a powerful reactor channeling the energy of a miniature sun through kyber crystals. Other weaponry includes 40 heavy turbolaser batteries, 40 ion cannons, 40 point-defense laser cannons, 35 warhead launchers, and 10 heavy tractor beam projectors, though the space for a hangar and other storage facilities is taken up by the superlaser.

 List of other Star Destroyers Victory Star Destroyer''': The Victory-class Star Destroyer originally featured only in Star Wars Legends novellas (see below). It first appeared in the new Star Wars canon in the 2014 novel Tarkin, written by James Luceno, and was first depicted in Darth Vader 6: Vader, Part VI, a 2015 comic book written by Kieron Gillen and illustrated by Salvador Larroca. The Victory Star Destroyer is the Imperial Navy's starting vessel in the core set of Fantasy Flight Games's Star Wars: Armada, a table top miniatures game released on March 27, 2015.

 Star Wars Legends 
In April 2014, most of the licensed Star Wars novels, games, and comics produced since 1976 (and prior to 2014), were rebranded by Lucasfilm as Star Wars Legends; and therefore declared non-canon to the franchise.

Star Destroyers feature in numerous Legends publications, with a considerable amount of additional notable information. According to West End Games' Star Wars: The Roleplaying Game sourcebooks and other texts, Imperial-class Star Destroyers are constructed by Kuat Drive Yards and hold a distinguished place in the Imperial Navy, symbolizing the Empire's military might with a peak number of more than 25,000 vessels. Like the Venator and Victory-class ships that precede it, the Imperial-class is a multi-role capital ship combining the roles of a battleship, starfighter carrier, and troopship. Notable for its massive size and overwhelming firepower compared to its fore-bearers; a single Imperial-class ship is capable of singlehandedly taking on a fleet of enemy vessels or "reducing the surface of a planet to a slag" (known as "Base Delta Zero"), and its mere presence is often enough to deter rebellion. The Imperial I is armed with 60 turbolasers, 60 ion cannons, and 10 tractor beam projectors for space combat. The standard complement is 72 TIE fighters (including 12 TIE Bombers and 12-24 TIE Interceptors), and a variety of support craft including shuttles and transports. Unlike other comparable capital ships like the Mon Calamari MC80 Star Cruiser of the Rebel Alliance (later New Republic), an Imperial-class Star Destroyer carries a full array of ground forces (including 9700 stormtroopers, 20 AT-ATs and 30 AT-STs) with dropships for rapid deployment to planetary surfaces, plus a prefabricated base if a permanent planetary garrison is required.

Though the Imperial Navy also has smaller capital ships like Nebulon-B Escort Frigates and CR90 Corvettes (the films show these vessels being used exclusively by the Rebel Alliance), Imperial-class Star Destroyers are usually the default choice for frontline deployments. At the Battle of Endor the Rebel Alliance captured two Imperial-class Star Destroyers and added them to the New Republic fleet; they serve alongside Mon Calamari Cruisers in General Han Solo's task force as told in the X-wing series of novels and Dark Empire comics. Although the New Republic eventually upgrades its starfleet with newer ship types, the Imperial-class Star Destroyer remains in service well into the New Jedi Order era and fights during the Yuuzhan Vong War.

In addition to Vader's command ship Executor, Star Wars novels introduce the prison ship Lusankya and stealth-armored  Knight Hammer as other in the class. Kevin J. Anderson's novel Darksaber describes a Super Star Destroyer as being "worth twenty Imperial Star Destroyers".

The description "Star Destroyer" and "Super Star Destroyer" are applied to several another massive dagger/triangle-shaped warships in Star Wars, such as the Pellaeon-class Star Destroyer in the Legacy comic series (2006–2010), and the reborn Emperor Palpatine's flagships Eclipse and Eclipse II Super Star Destroyers in the Dark Empire series (1991–1995). The Eclipse-class was perhaps the ultimate Super Star Destroyer or Star Dreadnought in the Expanded Universe, incorporating a Death Star-type superlaser but miniaturized and more advanced, and gravity well projectors to prevent enemies from jumping to hyperspace, and having strong enough shields/armor to be able to ram enemy vessels. Curtis Saxton, in the unofficial Star Wars Technical Commentaries (he has since been the author of the official Star Wars: Attack of the Clones Incredible Cross-Sections and Star Wars: Revenge of the Sith Incredible Cross-Sections), has advocated using the term Imperator-class in lieu of Imperial-class. Saxton argues that "Imperial Star Destroyer" is a somewhat generic term, as the vast majority of Star Destroyer types are operated by the Galactic Empire's Imperial Navy which technically means they are all "Imperial Star Destroyers", although the Imperator/Imperial-class Star Destroyers are by far the most common type. Similarly, the "Super Star Destroyer" moniker has been used for numerous unrelated vessels of varying sizes and classes, so fans have suggested labeling the class instead of by the lead ship such as Executor-class and Eclipse-class, with some referring to them instead as a "Star Dreadnought" (sometimes spelled "Star Dreadnaught") to emphasize their massive size relative to Star Destroyers. Author Jason Fry introduced the "Anaxes War College System" which specifically divide warships into different types depending on their size and power, which explain all the differently sized "Super Star Destroyers" appearing in the Expanded Universe (now Star Wars Legends), supplementing the contradictory classification systems used in Star Wars lore previously, becoming reference material in the Star Wars Sourcebooks by West End Games.

The Victory-class Star Destroyer first described in the early Star Wars novella, was initially designed as a direct predecessor to the Imperial-class during the development of A New Hope, which would make it a follow-up to the Venator-class seen in Revenge of the Sith. The Victory appears very similar in appearance to the Imperial-class which succeeded it; albeit the Victory being considerably smaller in scale (900 meters in length versus 1600 meters), adds atmospheric maneuvering "wings" on the port and starboard sides (according to Star Wars: The Roleplaying Game sourcebooks, the Victory I-class can enter a planetary atmosphere which is a unique attribute not found in the Victory II and Imperial-class Star Destroyers), and a shorter conning tower with different elements on the command bridge. The Victory-class was developed from a prototype Star Destroyer model created by Colin Cantwell for A New Hope, with the final design being used for the basis of the Imperial''-class.

See also
 List of Star Wars spacecraft
 List of Star Wars starfighters

Notes

Bibliography

References

Sources

External links
 
 
 
 
 
 
 
 

Star Wars spacecraft

Fictional elements introduced in 1977

Fictional military vehicles

sv:Lista över farkoster i Star Wars#Star Destroyer